The Khabarovsk class, or Project 09851 is a class of nuclear submarines under construction for the Russian Navy.

Development 
The lead submarine Khabarovsk, was slated to be floated in June 2020. However, the launch was delayed. This class of submarines is based on the Borei-class submarine's hull (other sources refers to the Project 949A class - to be verified), but is significantly smaller as it does not have the ballistic missile section. Surface displacement is reported to be about 10,000 tons. The class is intended to carry six Status-6 Oceanic Multipurpose System long-range nuclear torpedoes, and will be the second submarine to carry this weapon after . The class is also likely to carry anti-ship and land-attack missiles, in addition to torpedoes.

According to the open sources, a total of three or four submarines have been ordered. However, while some sources suggest all the submarines are of the same class (Project 09851), others suggest that the follow-on boats could be from a separate class (09853).

Units
Italics indicate estimated dates

References 

Submarine classes
Russian and Soviet navy submarine classes
Nuclear submarines of the Russian Navy
Attack submarines